Go Soeda successfully defended his title, defeating Mischa Zverev 7–5, 7–5 in the final.

Seeds

Draw

Finals

Top half

Bottom half

References
 Main Draw
 Qualifying Draw

Maui Challenger - Singles
ATP Challengers in Hawaii